Kuo Ting-tsai (28 September 1936 – 9 April 2015) was a Taiwanese politician.

He was born in Donggang, Pingtung, where he began his political career as mayor. He was later elected to four consecutive terms on the Pingtung County Council, including three as council speaker, and served on the Legislative Yuan from 1993 to 2002 as a representative of Pingtung County. Kuo was charged with breach of trust, fraud and falsification of documentation in September 1999, as the Pingtung County Prosecutors' Office investigated Kuo for actions taken during his leadership of Tungkang Credit Cooperative from 1992 to 1999. In November 2000, Kuo was sentenced to a prison term of twelve years. He ran for reelection in 2001, but was unable to retain his legislative seat. In February 2005, Kuo left for China, and was traced to Zhongshan in November 2010, when he was repatriated.

Kuo died of cancer complications in April 2015, aged 78.

References

1936 births
2015 deaths
Deaths from cancer in Taiwan
Pingtung County Members of the Legislative Yuan
Taiwanese politicians convicted of fraud
Members of the 2nd Legislative Yuan
Members of the 3rd Legislative Yuan
Members of the 4th Legislative Yuan
Kuomintang Members of the Legislative Yuan in Taiwan
Politicians convicted of embezzlement